Gompers is a surname. Notable people with the surname include:

Bill Gompers (1928–2019), American football player
Louis Gompers (1902–1981), Dutch diver
Paul A. Gompers (born 1964), American economist and professor
Samuel Gompers (1850–1924), American labor union leader of the American Federation of Labor